Pablo Alejandro Bonilla Serrada (born 2 December 1999) is a Venezuelan footballer who plays as a defender for Portland Timbers in Major League Soccer.

Career
In January 2020, Bonilla signed with Portland Timbers.

Honours

Club 
Portland Timbers
MLS is Back Tournament: 2020

References

1999 births
Living people
Venezuelan footballers
Venezuela under-20 international footballers
Association football defenders
People from Acarigua
Venezuelan Primera División players
Portuguesa F.C. players
Deportivo La Guaira players
Portland Timbers 2 players
Portland Timbers players
Expatriate soccer players in the United States
USL Championship players
Venezuelan expatriate footballers
Venezuelan expatriate sportspeople in the United States
Major League Soccer players
MLS Next Pro players
21st-century Venezuelan people